The Mesopotamian barbel or leopard barbel (Luciobarbus subquincunciatus) is a species of cyprinid fish found in the Tigris-Euphrates river system in Turkey, Syria, Iraq and Iran. This inhabitant of large rivers has been (and most likely is still) declining very rapidly during at least the last 30 years. It is now very rare and may be on the brink of extinction. While there are not enough data to identify the actual rate of population decline, it was once locally abundant but now almost absent.

References 

Luciobarbus
Fish of Asia
Fish described in 1868
Taxa named by Albert Günther